Zekiye is a Turkish given name for females. Notable people with the name include:

Zekiye Keskin Şatır (born 1976), Turkish archer
Zekiye Sultan (1872–1950), Ottoman princess

See also
Zeki

Turkish feminine given names